Intersectionality is an analytical framework for understanding how a person's various social and political identities combine to create different modes of discrimination and privilege. Intersectionality identifies multiple factors of advantage and disadvantage. Examples of these factors include gender, caste, sex, race, ethnicity, class, sexuality, religion, disability, weight, and physical appearance. These intersecting and overlapping social identities may be both empowering and oppressing.

Intersectionality broadens the scope of the first and second waves of feminism, which largely focused on the experiences of women who were white, middle-class and cisgender, to include the different experiences of women of color, poor women, immigrant women, and other groups. Intersectional feminism aims to separate itself from white feminism by acknowledging women's differing experiences and identities.

The term intersectionality was coined by Kimberlé Crenshaw in 1989. She describes how interlocking systems of power affect those who are most marginalized in society. Activists use the framework to promote social and political egalitarianism. Intersectionality opposes analytical systems that treat each axis of oppression in isolation. In this framework, for instance, discrimination against black women cannot be explained as a simple combination of misogyny and racism, but as something more complicated. Intersectionality engages in similar themes as triple oppression, which is the oppression associated with being a poor or immigrant woman of color. Intersectional analysis aligns very closely with anarcha-feminist power analysis frameworks. 

Criticism includes the framework's tendency to reduce individuals to specific demographic factors, and its use as an ideological tool against other feminist theories. Critics have characterized the framework as ambiguous and lacking defined goals. As it is based in standpoint theory, critics say the focus on subjective experiences can lead to contradictions and the inability to identify common causes of oppression. An analysis of academic articles published through May 12, 2020 found that intersectionality is frequently misunderstood when bridging theory into quantitative methodology.

Historical background

The concept of intersectionality was introduced to the field of legal studies by black feminist scholar Kimberlé Crenshaw, who used the term in a pair of essays published in 1989 and 1991. While the theory primarily began as an exploration of the oppression of black women within society and the ways in which they experience intersecting layers of different forms of oppression, the analysis has expanded to include many more aspects of social identity. Identities most commonly referenced in fourth-wave feminism include race, gender, sex, sexuality, class, ability, nationality, citizenship, religion, and body type. The term was not adopted widely by feminists until the 2000s and has only grown since that time.

Intersectionality originated in critical race studies and entails the interconnection of gender and race (Nash 2008). Intersectionality demonstrates a multifaced connection between race, gender, and other systems that work together to oppress while allowing privilege. Intersectionality is relative because it displays how race, gender, and other components operate as one to shape the experiences of others. Crenshaw used intersectionality to denote how race, class, gender, and other systems combine to shape the experiences of many by making room for privilege. Crenshaw used intersectionality to display the disadvantages caused by intersecting systems creating structural, political, and representational aspects of violence against minorities in the workplace and society. Crenshaw explained the dynamics that using gender, race, and other forms of power in politics and academics plays a big role in intersectionality.

In DeGraffenreid v. General Motors (1976), Emma DeGraffenreid and four other black female auto workers alleged compound employment discrimination against black women as a result of General Motors' seniority-based system of layoffs. The courts weighed the allegations of race and gender discrimination separately, finding that the employment of African-American male factory workers disproved racial discrimination, and the employment of white female office workers disproved gender discrimination. The court declined to consider compound discrimination, and dismissed the case. Crenshaw argued that in cases such as this, the courts have tended to ignore black women's unique experiences by treating them as  women or  black.

The ideas behind intersectional feminism existed long before the term was coined. For example, Sojourner Truth exemplifies intersectionality in her 1851 "Ain't I a Woman?" speech, in which she spoke from her racialized position as a former slave to critique essentialist notions of femininity. Similarly, in her 1892 essay "The Colored Woman's Office", Anna Julia Cooper identifies black women as the most important actors in social change movements because of their experience with multiple facets of oppression. Patricia Hill Collins has located the origins of intersectionality among black feminists, Chicana and other Latina feminists, indigenous feminists and Asian American feminists between the 1960s and 1980s. Collins has noted the existence of intellectuals at other times and in other places who discussed similar ideas about the interaction of different forms of inequality, such as Stuart Hall and the cultural studies movement, Nira Yuval-Davis, Anna Julia Cooper and Ida B. Wells. She noted that, as second-wave feminism receded in the 1980s, feminists of color such as Audre Lorde, Gloria E. Anzaldúa and Angela Davis entered academic environments and brought their perspectives to their scholarship. During this decade, many of the ideas that would together be labeled as intersectionality coalesced in U.S. academia under the banner of "race, class and gender studies".

As articulated by author bell hooks,  the emergence of intersectionality "challenged the notion that 'gender' was the primary factor determining a woman's fate". The historical exclusion of black women from the feminist movement in the United States resulted in many black 19th- and 20th-century feminists, such as Anna Julia Cooper, challenging their historical exclusion. This disputed the ideas of earlier feminist movements, which were primarily led by white middle-class women, suggesting that women were a homogeneous category who shared the same life experiences. However, once established that the forms of oppression experienced by white middle-class women were different from those experienced by black, poor, or disabled women, feminists began seeking ways to understand how gender, race, and class combine to "determine the female destiny".

The concept of intersectionality is intended to illuminate dynamics that have often been overlooked by feminist theory and movements. Racial inequality was a factor that was largely ignored by first-wave feminism, which was primarily concerned with gaining political equality between white men and white women. Early women's rights movements often exclusively pertained to the membership, concerns, and struggles of white women. Second-wave feminism worked to dismantle sexism relating to the perceived domestic purpose of women. While feminists during this time achieved success in the United States through the Equal Pay Act of 1963, Title IX, and Roe v. Wade, they largely alienated black women from platforms in the mainstream movement. However, third-wave feminism—which emerged shortly after the term intersectionality was coined in the late 1980s—noted the lack of attention to race, class, sexual orientation, and gender identity in early feminist movements, and tried to provide a channel to address political and social disparities. Intersectionality recognizes these issues which were ignored by early social justice movements. Many recent academics, such as Leslie McCall, have argued that the introduction of the intersectionality theory was vital to sociology and that before the development of the theory, there was little research that specifically addressed the experiences of people who are subjected to multiple forms of oppression within society. An example of this idea was championed by Iris Marion Young, arguing that differences must be acknowledged in order to find unifying social justice issues that create coalitions that aid in changing society for the better. More specifically, this relates to the ideals of the National Council of Negro Women (NCNW).

The term also has historical and theoretical links to the concept of simultaneity, which was advanced during the 1970s by members of the Combahee River Collective in Boston, Massachusetts. Simultaneity is the simultaneous influences of race, class, gender, and sexuality, which informed the member's lives and their resistance to oppression. Thus, the women of the Combahee River Collective advanced an understanding of African-American experiences that challenged analyses emerging from black and male-centered social movements, as well as those from mainstream cisgender, white, middle-class, heterosexual feminists.

Since the term was coined, many feminist scholars have emerged with historical support for the intersectional theory. These women include Beverly Guy-Sheftall and her fellow contributors to Words of Fire: An Anthology of African-American Feminist Thought, a collection of articles describing the multiple oppressions black women in America have experienced from the 1830s to contemporary times. Guy-Sheftall speaks about the constant premises that influence the lives of African-American women, saying, "black women experience a special kind of oppression and suffering in this country which is racist, sexist, and classist because of their dual race and gender identity and their limited access to economic resources." Other writers and theorists were using intersectional analysis in their work before the term was coined. For example, Deborah K. King published the article "Multiple Jeopardy, Multiple Consciousness: The Context of a Black Feminist Ideology" in 1988, just before Crenshaw coined the term intersectionality. In the article, King addresses what soon became the foundation for intersectionality, saying, "black women have long recognized the special circumstances of our lives in the United States: the commonalities that we share with all women, as well as the bonds that connect us to the men of our race." Additionally, Gloria Wekker describes how Gloria Anzaldúa's work as a Chicana feminist theorist exemplifies how "existent categories for identity are strikingly not dealt with in separate or mutually exclusive terms, but are always referred to in relation to one another". Wekker also points to the words and activism of Sojourner Truth as an example of an intersectional approach to social justice. In her speech, "Ain't I a Woman?", Truth identifies the difference between the oppression of white and black women. She says that white women are often treated as emotional and delicate, while black women are subjected to racist abuse. However, this was largely dismissed by white feminists who worried that this would distract from their goal of women's suffrage and instead focused their attention on emancipation.

Feminist thought

In 1989, Kimberlé Crenshaw coined the term intersectionality as a way to help explain the oppression of African-American women in her essay "Demarginalizing the Intersection of Race and Sex: A black Feminist Critique of Anti-discrimination Doctrine, Feminist Theory and Antiracist Politics". Crenshaw's term is now at the forefront of national conversations about racial justice, identity politics, and policing—and over the years has helped shape legal discussions. In her work, Crenshaw discusses Black feminism, arguing that the experience of being a black woman cannot be understood in terms independent of either being black or a woman. Rather, it must include interactions between the two identities, which, she adds, should frequently reinforce one another.

In order to show that non-white women have a vastly different experience from white women due to their race and/or class and that their experiences are not easily voiced or amplified, Crenshaw explores two types of male violence against women: domestic violence and rape. Through her analysis of these two forms of male violence against women, Crenshaw says that the experiences of non-white women consist of a combination of both racism and sexism. She says that because non-white women are present within discourses that have been designed to address either race or sex—but not both at the same time—non-white women are marginalized within both of these systems of oppression as a result.

In her work, Crenshaw identifies three aspects of intersectionality that affect the visibility of non-white women: structural intersectionality, political intersectionality, and representational intersectionality. Structural intersectionality deals with how non-white women experience domestic violence and rape in a manner qualitatively different from white women. Political intersectionality examines how laws and policies intended to increase equality have paradoxically decreased the visibility of violence against non-white women. Finally, representational intersectionality delves into how pop culture portrayals of non-white women can obscure their own authentic lived experiences.

The term gained prominence in the 1990s, particularly in the wake of the further development of Crenshaw's work in the writings of sociologist Patricia Hill Collins. Crenshaw's term, Collins says, replaced her own previous coinage "black feminist thought", and "increased the general applicability of her theory from African American women to all women". Much like Crenshaw, Collins argues that cultural patterns of oppression are not only interrelated, but are bound together and influenced by the intersectional systems of society, such as race, gender, class, and ethnicity. Collins describes this as "interlocking social institutions [that] have relied on multiple forms of segregation... to produce unjust results".

Collins sought to create frameworks to think about intersectionality, rather than expanding on the theory itself. She identified three main branches of study within intersectionality. One branch deals with the background, ideas, issues, conflicts, and debates within intersectionality. Another branch seeks to apply intersectionality as an analytical strategy to various social institutions in order to examine how they might perpetuate social inequality. The final branch formulates intersectionality as a critical praxis to determine how social justice initiatives can use intersectionality to bring about social change.

One writer who focused on intersectionality was Audre Lorde, who was a self-proclaimed "Black, Lesbian, Mother, Warrior, Poet". Even in the title she gave herself, Lorde expressed her multifaceted personhood and demonstrated her intersectional struggles with being a black, gay woman. Lorde commented in her essay The master's tools will never dismantle the master's house, that she was living in "a country where racism, sexism, and homophobia are inseparable". Here, Lorde outlines the importance of intersectionality, while acknowledging that different prejudices are inherently linked. Lorde's formulation of this linkage remains seminal in intersectional feminism.

Though intersectionality began with the exploration of the interplay between gender and race, over time other identities and oppressions were added to the theory. For example, in 1981 Cherríe Moraga and Gloria Anzaldúa published the first edition of This Bridge Called My Back. This anthology explored how classifications of sexual orientation and class also mix with those of race and gender to create even more distinct political categories. Many black, Latina, and Asian writers featured in the collection stress how their sexuality interacts with their race and gender to inform their perspectives. Similarly, poor women of color detail how their socio-economic status adds a layer of nuance to their identities, ignored or misunderstood by middle-class white feminists.

According to black feminists, experiences of class, gender, and sexuality cannot be adequately understood unless the influence of racialization is carefully considered. This focus on racialization was highlighted many times by scholar and feminist bell hooks, specifically in her 1981 book Ain't I A Woman: Black Women and Feminism. Feminists argue that an understanding of intersectionality is a vital element of gaining political and social equality and improving our democratic system. Collins's theory represents the sociological crossroads between modern and post-modern feminist thought.

Chiara Bottici has argued that criticisms of intersectionality that find it to be incomplete, or argue that it fails to recognise the specificity of women's oppression, can be met with an anarcha-feminism that recognises "that there is something specific about the oppression of women and that in order to fight it you have to fight all other forms of oppression."

W. E. B. Du Bois theorized that the intersectional paradigms of race, class, and nation might explain specific aspects of the black political economy. Collins writes: "Du Bois saw race, class, and nation not primarily as personal identity categories but as social hierarchies that shaped African-American access to status, poverty, and power." Du Bois omitted gender from his theory and considered it more of a personal identity category.

Cheryl Townsend Gilkes expands on this by pointing out the value of centering on the experiences of black women. Joy James takes things one step further by "using paradigms of intersectionality in interpreting social phenomena". Collins later integrated these three views by examining a black political economy through the centering of black women's experiences and the use of a theoretical framework of intersectionality.

Collins uses a Marxist feminist approach and applies her intersectional principles to what she calls the "work/family nexus and black women's poverty". In her 2000 article "Black Political Economy" she describes how, in her view, the intersections of consumer racism, gender hierarchies, and disadvantages in the labor market can be centered on black women's unique experiences. Considering this from a historical perspective and examining interracial marriage laws and property inheritance laws creates what Collins terms a "distinctive work/family nexus that in turn influences the overall patterns of black political economy". For example, anti-miscegenation laws effectively suppressed the upward economic mobility of black women.

The intersectionality of race and gender has been shown to have a visible impact on the labor market. "Sociological research clearly shows that accounting for education, experience, and skill does not fully explain significant differences in labor market outcomes." The three main domains in which we see the impact of intersectionality are wages, discrimination, and domestic labor. Those who experience privilege within the social hierarchy in terms of race, gender, and socio-economic status are less likely to receive lower wages, to be subjected to stereotypes and discriminated against, or to be hired for exploitative domestic positions. Studies of the labor market and intersectionality provide a better understanding of economic inequalities and the implications of the multidimensional impact of race and gender on social status within society.

Forms: structural, political, representational
Kimberlé Crenshaw, in "Mapping the Margins: Intersectionality, Identity Politics, and Violence Against Women of Color", uses and explains three different forms of intersectionality to describe the violence that women experience. According to Crenshaw, there are three forms of intersectionality: structural, political, and representational intersectionality.

Structural intersectionality is used to describe how different structures work together and create a complex which highlights the differences in the experiences of women of color with domestic violence and rape. Structural intersectionality entails the ways in which classism, sexism, and racism interlock and oppress women of color while molding their experiences in different arenas. Crenshaw's analysis of structural intersectionality was used during her field study of battered women. In this study, Crenshaw uses intersectionality to display the multilayered oppressions that women who are victims of domestic violence face.

Political intersectionality highlights two conflicting systems in the political arena, which separates women and women of color into two subordinate groups. The experiences of women of color differ from those of white women and men of color due to their race and gender often intersecting. White women suffer from gender bias, and men of color suffer from racial bias; however, both of their experiences differ from that of women of color, because women of color experience both racial and gender bias. According to Crenshaw, a political failure of the antiracist and feminist discourses was the exclusion of the intersection of race and gender that places priority on the interest of "people of color" and "women", thus disregarding one while highlighting the other. Political engagement should reflect support of women of color; a prime example of the exclusion of women of color that shows the difference in the experiences of white women and women of color is the women's suffrage march.

Representational intersectionality advocates for the creation of imagery that is supportive of women of color. Representational intersectionality condemns sexist and racist marginalization of women of color in representation. Representational intersectionality also highlights the importance of women of color having representation in media and contemporary settings.

Key concepts

Interlocking matrix of oppression
Collins refers to the various intersections of social inequality as the matrix of domination. These are also known as "vectors of oppression and privilege". These terms refer to how differences among people (sexual orientation, class, race, age, etc.) serve as oppressive measures towards women and change the experience of living as a woman in society. Collins, Audre Lorde (in Sister Outsider), and bell hooks point towards either/or thinking as an influence on this oppression and as further intensifying these differences. Specifically, Collins refers to this as the construct of dichotomous oppositional difference. This construct is characterized by its focus on differences rather than similarities. Lisa A. Flores suggests, when individuals live in the borders, they "find themselves with a foot in both worlds". The result is "the sense of being neither" exclusively one identity nor another.

Standpoint epistemology and the outsider within
Both Collins and Dorothy Smith have been instrumental in providing a sociological definition of standpoint theory. A standpoint is an individual's world perspective. The theoretical basis of this approach views societal knowledge as being located within an individual's specific geographic location. In turn, knowledge becomes distinct and subjective; it varies depending on the social conditions under which it was produced.

The concept of the outsider within refers to a standpoint encompassing the self, family, and society. This relates to the specific experiences to which people are subjected as they move from a common cultural world (i.e., family) to that of modern society. Therefore, even though a woman—especially a Black woman—may become influential in a particular field, she may feel as though she does not belong. Her personality, behavior, and cultural being overshadow her value as an individual; thus, she becomes the outsider within.

Resisting oppression
Speaking from a critical standpoint, Collins points out that Brittan and Maynard say that "domination always involves the objectification of the dominated; all forms of oppression imply the devaluation of the subjectivity of the oppressed". She later notes that self-valuation and self-definition are two ways of resisting oppression, and claims the practice of self-awareness helps to preserve the self-esteem of the group that is being oppressed while allowing them to avoid any dehumanizing outside influences.

Marginalized groups often gain a status of being an "other". In essence, you are "an other" if you are different from what Audre Lorde calls the mythical norm. Gloria Anzaldúa, scholar of Chicana cultural theory, theorized that the sociological term for this is "othering", i.e. specifically attempting to establish a person as unacceptable based on a certain, unachieved criterion.

Practical applications

Intersectionality can be applied to nearly all fields from politics, education healthcare, and employment, to economics. For example, within the institution of education, Sandra Jones' research on working-class women in academia takes into consideration meritocracy within all social strata, but argues that it is complicated by race and the external forces that oppress. Additionally, people of color often experience differential treatment in the healthcare system. For example, in the period immediately after 9/11 researchers noted low birth weights and other poor birth outcomes among Muslim and Arab Americans, a result they connected to the increased racial and religious discrimination of the time. Some researchers have also argued that immigration policies can affect health outcomes through mechanisms such as stress, restrictions on access to health care, and the social determinants of health. The Women's Institute for Science, Equity and Race advocates for the disaggregation of data in order to highlight intersectional identities in all kinds of research.

Additionally, applications with regard to property and wealth can be traced to the American historical narrative that is filled "with tensions and struggles over property—in its various forms. From the removal of Native Americans (and later Japanese Americans) from the land, to military conquest of the Mexicans, to the construction of Africans as property, the ability to define, possess, and own property has been a central feature of power in America ... [and where] social benefits accrue largely to property owners." One could apply the intersectionality framework analysis to various areas where race, class, gender, sexuality and ability are affected by policies, procedures, practices, and laws in "context-specific inquiries, including, for example, analyzing the multiple ways that race and gender interact with class in the labor market; interrogating the ways that states constitute regulatory regimes of identity, reproduction, and family formation"; and examining the inequities in "the power relations [of the intersectionality] of whiteness ... [where] the denial of power and privilege ... of whiteness, and middle-classness", while not addressing "the role of power it wields in social relations".

Intersectionality in a global context

Over the last couple of decades in the European Union (EU), there has been discussion regarding the intersections of social classifications. Before Crenshaw coined her definition of intersectionality, there was a debate on what these societal categories were. The once definite borders between the categories of gender, race, and class have instead fused into a multidimensional intersection of "race" that now includes religion, sexuality, ethnicities, etc. In the EU and UK, these intersections are referred to as the notion of "multiple discrimination". Although the EU passed a non-discrimination law which addresses these multiple intersections; there is however debate on whether the law is still proactively focusing on the proper inequalities. Outside of the EU, intersectional categories have also been considered. In Analyzing Gender, Intersectionality, and Multiple Inequalities: Global, Transnational and Local Contexts, the authors argue: "The impact of patriarchy and traditional assumptions about gender and families are evident in the lives of Chinese migrant workers (Chow, Tong), sex workers and their clients in South Korea (Shin), and Indian widows (Chauhan), but also Ukrainian migrants (Amelina) and Australian men of the new global middle class (Connell)." This text suggests that there are many more intersections of discrimination for people around the globe than Crenshaw originally accounted for in her definition.

Chandra Mohanty discusses alliances between women throughout the world as intersectionality in a global context. She rejects the western feminist theory, especially when it writes about global women of color and generally associated "third world women". She argues that "third world women" are often thought of as a homogenous entity, when, in fact, their experience of oppression is informed by their geography, history, and culture. When western feminists write about women in the global South in this way, they dismiss the inherent intersecting identities that are present in the dynamic of feminism in the global South. Mohanty questions the performance of intersectionality and relationality of power structures within the US and colonialism and how to work across identities with this history of colonial power structures. This lack of homogeneity and intersecting identities can be seen through feminism in India, which goes over how women in India practice feminism within social structures and the continuing effects of colonization that differ from that of Western and other non-Western countries.

This is elaborated on by Christine Bose, who discusses a global use of intersectionality which works to remove associations of specific inequalities with specific institutions while showing that these systems generate intersectional effects. She uses this approach to develop a framework that can analyze gender inequalities across different nations and differentiates this from an approach (the one that Mohanty was referring to) which, one, paints national-level inequalities as the same and, two, differentiates only between the global North and South. This is manifested through the intersection of global dynamics like economics, migration, or violence, with regional dynamics, like histories of the nation or gendered inequalities in education and property education.

There is an issue globally with the way the law interacts with intersectionality, for example, the UK's legislation to protect workers' rights has a distinct issue with intersectionality. Under the Equality Act 2010, the things that are listed as 'protected characteristics' are "age, disability, gender reassignment, marriage or civil partnership, pregnancy and maternity, race, religion or belief, sex, and sexual orientation". "Section 14 contains a provision to cover direct discrimination on up to two combined grounds—known as combined or dual discrimination. However, this section has never been brought into effect as the government deemed it too 'complicated and burdensome' for businesses." This demonstrates systematic neglect of the issues that intersectionality presents, because the UK courts have explicitly decided not to cover intersectional discrimination in their courts.

Marie-Claire Belleau argues for "strategic intersectionality" in order to foster cooperation between feminisms of different ethnicities. She refers to different nat-cult (national-cultural) groups that produce different types of feminisms. Using Québécois nat-cult as an example, Belleau says that many nat-cult groups contain infinite sub-identities within themselves, arguing that there are endless ways in which different feminisms can cooperate by using strategic intersectionality, and that these partnerships can help bridge gaps between "dominant and marginal" groups. Belleau argues that, through strategic intersectionality, differences between nat-cult feminisms are neither essentialist nor universal, but should be understood as resulting from socio-cultural contexts. Furthermore, the performances of these nat-cult feminisms are also not essentialist. Instead, they are strategies.

Transnational intersectionality
Third World feminists and transnational feminists criticize intersectionality as a concept emanating from WEIRD (Western, educated, industrialized, rich, democratic) societies that unduly universalizes women's experiences. Third world feminists have worked to revise Western conceptualizations of intersectionality that assume all women experience the same type of gender and racial oppression. Shelly Grabe coined the term transnational intersectionality to represent a more comprehensive conceptualization of intersectionality. Grabe wrote, "Transnational intersectionality places importance on the intersections among gender, ethnicity, sexuality, economic exploitation, and other social hierarchies in the context of empire building or imperialist policies characterized by historical and emergent global capitalism." Both Third World and transnational feminists advocate attending to "complex and intersecting oppressions and multiple forms of resistance".
Vrushali Patil argues that intersectionality ought to recognize transborder constructions of racial and cultural hierarchies. About the effect of the state on identity formation, Patil says: "If we continue to neglect cross-border dynamics and fail to problematize the nation and its emergence via transnational processes, our analyses will remain tethered to the spatialities and temporalities of colonial modernity."

Social work
In the field of social work, proponents of intersectionality hold that unless service providers take intersectionality into account, they will be of less use for various segments of the population, such as those reporting domestic violence or disabled victims of abuse. According to intersectional theory, the practice of domestic violence counselors in the United States urging all women to report their abusers to police is of little use to women of color due to the history of racially motivated police brutality, and those counselors should adapt their counseling for women of color.

Women with disabilities encounter more frequent domestic abuse with a greater number of abusers. Health care workers and personal care attendants perpetrate abuse in these circumstances, and women with disabilities have fewer options for escaping the abusive situation. There is a "silence" principle concerning the intersectionality of women and disability, which maintains an overall social denial of the prevalence of abuse among the disabled and leads to this abuse being frequently ignored when encountered. A paradox is presented by the overprotection of people with disabilities combined with the expectations of promiscuous behavior of disabled women. This leads to limited autonomy and social isolation of disabled individuals, which place women with disabilities in situations where further or more frequent abuse can occur.

Situated intersectionality
Expanding on Crenshaw's framework, migration researcher Nira Yuval-Davis proposed the concept of situated intersectionality as a theoretical framework that can encompass different types of inequalities, simultaneously (ontologically), but enmeshed (concretely), and based on a dialogical epistemology which can incorporate "differentially located situated gazes" at these inequalities. Reilly, Bjørnholt and Tastsoglou note that "Yuval-Davis shares Fineman’s critical stance vis-à-vis the fragmentising and essentialising tendencies of identity politics, but without resorting to a universalism that eschews difference."

Implementation within organizations 
Practices referred to as intersectionality may be implemented in different ways in different organizations. Within the context of the UK charity sector, Christoffersen identified six different conceptualizations of intersectionality. "Generic intersectionality" was observed in policy areas, where intersectionality was conceptualized as all policies being in everyone's universal interest rather than being targeted to particular groups, "pan equality" was concern for issues that affected most marginalised groups but not people as a whole. "Multi-strand intersectionality" attempted to consider different groups when making a decision, but rarely viewed the interests of the groups as competing or focusing on issues for a particular group. "Diversity within" considered one main form of identity, such as gender, as most important while occasionally considering other aspects of identity, with these different forms of identity sometimes seen as detracting from the main identity. "Intersections of equality strands" considered separate distinct identities but no form of identity (e.g., women) was seen as more relevant. In this approach is was sometimes felt that if one dealt with the most marginalised identity the system would tend to work for all people. Christoffersen referred to some of these forms of inequality as "additive" where combined inequalities can be sees as a combined set of features something unique.

Criticism

Methods and ideology
Generating testable predictions from intersectionality theory can be complex; postintersectional critics of intersectional theory fault its proponents for inadequately explained causal methodology and say they have made incorrect predictions about the status of some minority groups. For example, despite antisemitism rising across the globe, Jews are often excluded from intersectionality movements on the grounds that they are not sufficiently oppressed.

According to David Schraub's White Jews: An Intersectional Approach:

"Vigorous theoretical accounts of how antisemitism currently manifests in Western societies lag behind the excellent work focused on other oppressions. And though in theory intersectionality has much to offer Jews as an analytical tool for untangling some of these questions, in practice intersectional theorists have largely ignored the Jewish case. While intersectional approaches to Jewish difference are not unheard of, they are exceedingly rare."

Kathy Davis asserts that intersectionality is ambiguous and open-ended, and that its "lack of clear-cut definition or even specific parameters has enabled it to be drawn upon in nearly any context of inquiry". 

Rekia Jibrin and Sara Salem argue that intersectional theory creates a unified idea of anti-oppression politics that requires a lot out of its adherents, often more than can reasonably be expected, creating difficulties achieving praxis. They also say that intersectional philosophy encourages a focus on the issues inside the group instead of on society at large, and that intersectionality is "a call to complexity and to abandon oversimplification... this has the parallel effect of emphasizing 'internal differences' over hegemonic structures".

Barbara Tomlinson, of the Department of Feminist Studies at University of California, Santa Barbara, has been critical of the applications of intersectional theory to attack other ways of feminist thinking.

Lisa Downing argues that intersectionality focuses too much on group identities, which can lead it to ignore the fact that people are individuals, not just members of a class. Ignoring this can cause intersectionality to lead to a simplistic analysis and inaccurate assumptions about how a person's values and attitudes are determined.

A review of quantitative studies seeking evidence on intersectional issues published through May 12, 2020 found that many quantitative methods were simplistic and were often misapplied or misinterpreted.

Psychology

Researchers in psychology have incorporated intersection effects since the 1950s. These intersection effects were based on studying the lenses of biases, heuristics, stereotypes, and judgments. Psychologists have extended research in psychological biases to the areas of cognitive and motivational psychology. What is found, is that every human mind has its own biases in judgment and decision-making that tend to preserve the status quo by avoiding change and attention to ideas that exist outside one's personal realm of perception. Psychological interaction effects span a range of variables, although person-by-situation effects are the most examined category. As a result, psychologists do not construe the interaction effect of demographics such as gender and race as either more noteworthy or less noteworthy than any other interaction effect. In addition, oppression can be regarded as a subjective construct when viewed as an absolute hierarchy. Even if an objective definition of oppression was reached, person-by-situation effects would make it difficult to deem certain persons or categories of persons as uniformly oppressed. For instance, black men are stereotypically perceived as violent, which may be a disadvantage in police interactions, but also as physically attractive, which may be advantageous in romantic situations.

Psychological studies have shown that possessing multiple oppressed or marginalized identities has effects that are not necessarily additive, or even multiplicative, but rather, interactive in complex ways. For instance, black gay men may be more positively evaluated than black heterosexual men, because the "feminine" aspects of gay stereotypes temper the hypermasculine and aggressive aspect of black stereotypes.

Controversy in France
In France, intersectionality has been denounced as a school of thought imported from the US. The French Minister of Education Jean-Michel Blanquer declared that intersectionality is in conflict with the French republican values. He accused advocates of intersectionality of playing into the hands of Islamism.
In turn, Libération accused Blanquer of not having a good understanding of the concept of intersectionality and of attacking the concept for political reasons. The Murder of Samuel Paty supposedly provided a pretext for such attacks on the concept of intersectionality.

Conservatism 
Conservatives believe that intersectionality allows people of color and women of color to victimize themselves and let themselves submit to special treatment. Instead, they classify the concept of intersectionality as a sort of hierarchy of oppression to see which person will receive more unfair treatment than another person would. American conservative commentator Ben Shapiro stated in 2019 that "I would define intersectionality as, at least the way that I’ve seen it manifest on college campuses, and in a lot of the political left, as a hierarchy of victimhood in which people are considered members of a victim class by virtue of membership in a particular group, and at the intersection of various groups lies the ascent on the hierarchy".

See also

 Black feminism
 Disability justice
 Identity politics
 Humanism
 Identitarianism
 Kyriarchy
 Misogynoir
 Oppression Olympics
 Privilege (social inequality)
 Transnational feminism
 Womanism
 Implicit stereotype
 Polylogism
 Class discrimination

Notes

References

Further reading

External links
 
 
 

 
Intersectional feminism
Feminist theory
2010s controversies
2020s controversies